Brijeshwar Singh (born 22 September 1968), is a writer, poet and theatre promoter based in Bareilly, Uttar Pradesh, India. His patronage and promotion of theatre through the Rang Vinayak Rang Mandal theatre repertoire and the annual theatre festival being organised in his own Windermere Theatre earned him the U.P. Sangeet Natak Academy award for 2020. His Daya Drishti Charitable Trust helps children born with thalassemia avail regular and life saving transfusions. His second book ‘Next Patient, Please’ was released on 26 March 2022.

Early life

Singh was born on 22 September 1968 in Lucknow to Rajendra Bahadur Singh and Gayatri Devi. His father was an officer in Provincial Services. In Lucknow, Brijeshwar was educated at City Montessori School. Later, his father was transferred to Bareilly where Brijeshwar studied at Government Inter College (GIC). He completed his higher studies from King George's Medical College (now known as King George's Medical University), Lucknow and Ganesh Shankar Vidyarthi Memorial Medical College (GSVM), Kanpur.

Theatre promotion

Brijeshwar fell in love with theatre during his days at New Delhi when a friend introduced him to the play "Tumhari Amrita" starring Farooq Sheikh and Shabana Azmi.

When Brijeshwar came back to Bareilly, he established a theatre repertoire and named it 'Rang Vinayak Rang Mandal' (RVRM). He is the founder  and director of RVRM.

In 2009, Brijeshwar Singh built a black box theatre at Bareilly. The auditorium is called Windermere Theatre.

Brijeshwar Singh has started offering grants to upcoming talent in theatre. It is called the ‘Windermere Theatre Grant’. The 14th National Windermere Theatre Festival will also be organized in 2023.

Brijeshwar Singh is the organizer of the Annual Windermere Theatre Festival at Bareilly. He has organised 13 editions of the festival.

Brijeshwar's patronage and promotion of theatre earned him the U.P. Sangeet Natak Akademi award for 2020.

Writer & poet

Brijeshwar wrote his first book 'In & Out of Theatre: Heart-Warming Vignettes from Beyond the Operation Theatre' in 2014. The book was published by Supernova Publishers.

He has recently completed his second book 'Next Patient, Please'. Which was published on 26 March 2022.

Brijeshwar Singh also writes poems in Hindi. His story, 'Keh do Gunjan!' was published in India Today's annual literature edition, 2019. ‘Next patient, please’ has been showcased at the World Book Fair 2023.

Philanthropy

Brijeshwar Singh founded Daya Drishti Charitable Trust. The charitable organization helps children born with thalassemia avail regular and life saving transfusions. The trust also offers free medical services to the underprivileged. Brijeshwar Singh has also been providing expert advice on major incidents related to thalassemia. Recently, he talked to an online media platform regarding the Nagpur (Maharashtra, India) incident where four thalassemic kids got infected with HIV because of unsafe blood transfusion.

References 

1968 births
Living people